WJGN-CD, virtual channel 38 (UHF digital channel 27), is a low-powered, Class A NRB-affiliated television station licensed to Virginia Beach, Virginia, United States. The station is owned by The Union Mission. Prior to the digital switchover, it was known as WJGN-LP on analog channel 5. It is licensed to Union Mission Ministries to broadcast from Chesapeake, and has its studios on North Landing Road in Virginia Beach.

References

External links
  FCC

Chesapeake, Virginia
JGN-CD
Low-power television stations in the United States